Senator Nass may refer to:

Richard Nass (born 1943), Maine State Senate
Stephen Nass (born 1952), Wisconsin State Senate